Hasan Azizul Huq (2 February 1939 – 15 November 2021) was a Bangladeshi short-story writer and novelist. He was awarded Ekushey Padak in 1999, Bangla Academy Literary Award in 1970 and Independence Award in 2019.

Early life and education
Huq was born in Jabgraam in Burdwan district of West Bengal. In 1947, his parents moved to Phultala, near the city of Khulna, Bangladesh. He completed his post-graduation from Rajshahi University in 1960. He served as a faculty in the department of philosophy of the same university.

Huq was the second Bangabandhu Chair of the department of history at the University of Dhaka.

Career
Huq's first published volume is Samudrer Swapna, Shiter Aranya  (1964). Among other notable volumes are: Atmaja o Ekti Karabi Gaachh (1967), Jeeban Ghase Agun (1973), Namhin Gotrohin (1974), Pataale, Haspataale (1981), Kathakataa (1981), Aprakasher Bhaar (1988) and Ma Meyer Sansar (1997) and Raarbanger Golpo (1999). He wrote two autobiographies, Fire Jai Fire Ashi and Uki Diye Digonto.

His stories have been translated into English, Hindi, Urdu, Russian, Czech and Japanese.

Works
গল্পগ্রন্থ -
১.আত্নজা ও একটি করবী গাছ।
২.নামহীন গোত্রহীন
৩.আমরা অপেক্ষা করছি
৪.সমুদ্রের স্বপ্ন শীতের অরণ্য
৫.জীবন ঘষে আগুন
৬.পাতালে হাসপাতালে
৭.রোদে যাব
৮.রাঢ়বঙের গল্প
৯.মা ও মেয়ের সংসার
১০.বিধবার কথা ও অন্যান্য গল্প

Awards
 Bangla Academy Literary Award (1970)
 Ekushey Padak (1999)
 Ananda Purashkar (2008)
 Druhee Katha-Shahityak Abdur Rouf Choudhury Memorial Award
 Adamjee Literary Award
 Lekhok Shibir Puroshkar
 Alaol Sahitya Puroshkar
 Alokto Sahitya Puroshkar
 Agrani Bank Puroshkar
 Philips Sahitya Puroshkar
Independence Award (2019)

Death 
Hasan Azizul Huq died on 15 November 2021 at Bihas Chouddopai University Housing Society, Rajshahi.

References

Further reading
 Golpo Songroho (Collected Stories), the national textbook of B.A. (pass and subsidiary) course  of Bangladesh, published by University of Dhaka in 1979 (reprint in 1986).
 Bangla Sahitya (Bengali Literature), the national textbook of intermediate (college) level of Bangladesh published in 1996 by all educational boards.

1939 births
2021 deaths
Bengali-language writers
Bangladeshi male novelists
Recipients of the Ananda Purashkar
Recipients of the Ekushey Padak
Recipients of Bangla Academy Award
Academic staff of the University of Rajshahi
Rajshahi College alumni
Recipients of the Independence Day Award
Recipients of the Adamjee Literary Award
People from Bardhaman
Bangladeshi people of Indian descent
Writers from West Bengal